The Greatest is a 2009 American drama film written and directed by Shana Feste in her directorial debut, and starring Pierce Brosnan (also an executive producer), Susan Sarandon, Carey Mulligan, and Michael Shannon.

Plot
Eighteen-year-old Bennett Brewer and Rose have sex together, the only time either of them have ever done so. When Bennett is killed when a truck crashes into his car while he is parked in the middle of the road at night, his family feel like they cannot go on. His mother Grace and his father Allen get an unexpected visitor knocking at their door; it turns out to be Rose, who is pregnant with Bennett's child. As the story develops, Bennett's younger brother Ryan is introduced and he is grieving the fact he did not say a final good bye to his brother. One sees the true relationships of the family as the story comes together, Grace waits at the bed of Jordan Walker, the man driving the truck which collided with Bennett's car in the crash. She is waiting for him to wake so she can ask him what occurred during the 17 minutes between the crash and his death. After a while, she finds out the truth, but is disappointed with what she hears. In the last moments, Bennett was not calling for his mother – he was calling to Rose asking Walker to make sure that she was safe.

Allen hires a cleaner to clean the house, but when Grace finds out she is terribly angry, claiming their son has been washed away. Allen then appears to be having a heart attack, whilst Grace carries on shouting until she realises what is happening. At the hospital bed, shortly after Grace returns from finding out about Bennett's final minutes, Allen breaks down crying, saying that he had been holding in all his grief and upset, and that he could have done something to prevent the crash and his son's death.

Meanwhile, Rose has overheard Grace saying Rose should have died instead of Bennett, so she leaves and seeks the help of her own mother. She soon realises that all her mother is bothered about is trying to get money from the Brewers, claiming it will help her. The Brewers try to find Rose and they find her in labor and persuade her to go to the hospital and, while in the car on the way, she seeks to find out everything about Bennett she did not already know.

When the film draws to a close, one sees Rose and the baby, a girl called Ruby, Grace's favourite girl's name. The film ends with the moment Bennett spoke to Rose earlier on the day he died.

Cast
 Pierce Brosnan as Allen Brewer
 Susan Sarandon as Grace Brewer
 Carey Mulligan as Rose
 Johnny Simmons as Ryan Brewer
 Aaron Taylor-Johnson as Bennett Brewer
 Zoë Kravitz as Ashley
 Jennifer Ehle as Joan
 Amy Morton as Lydia
 Michael Shannon as Jordan Walker

Production
Feste received the help of Creative Artists Agency (CAA) director Richard Lovett, for whom she had been working as an assistant in the past. The CAA sent Pierce Brosnan's producing partner, Beau St. Clair, the script and she convinced him to read it. Shortly after, Susan Sarandon joined the film, convinced by Brosnan. Feste met with a lot of actresses for Carey Mulligan's role but ultimately Mulligan stood out. It was Feste's directorial debut. To gain the confidence of investors and producers, she made a scrapbook which contained her ideas on tone, camera movement, color, space and lines.

Principal photography took place in Rockland County, New York. The film was shot in 35 mm format.

Reception
The film screened at the 2009 Sundance Film Festival. Another film starring Mulligan, the Oscar-nominated An Education, also screened at the festival. The film ranking website Rotten Tomatoes reported that 53% of critics had given the film positive reviews, based upon a sample of 58.

References

External links

2009 films
2009 directorial debut films
2009 romantic drama films
2000s American films
2000s English-language films
American romantic drama films
Films about death
Films about families
Films directed by Shana Feste
Films scored by Christophe Beck
Films shot in New York (state)
Teenage pregnancy in film